Kurt W. Schuller (born June 21, 1955) is the former State Treasurer of Wisconsin and a restaurateur from Eden, Wisconsin.

Biography
Born in Milwaukee, Wisconsin, Schuller graduated from Concordia University Wisconsin with an associate degree in management and communications. Schuller owned and managed restaurants and lives in Eden. He worked for 20 years as a chef, became the general manager of The Club Forest Restaurant, owned and operated Wolfendale's Restaurant in Sussex from 1996 to 2005, and worked for Old Country Buffet.  On November 2, 2010, he defeated incumbent Democrat Dawn Marie Sass for the office of the State Treasurer of Wisconsin. Schuller pledged to serve one term in office and to work for the abolition of the office.

Wisconsin 2014 elections
In March 2014, he announced that he was not running for re-election. He was instead running for a seat on the Fond du Lac County Board of Supervisors. In the Wisconsin Spring Election 2014, Schuller was defeated in his race for the board.

References

1955 births
American chefs
American male chefs
American restaurateurs
Businesspeople from Milwaukee
Concordia University Wisconsin alumni
Living people
People from Eden, Wisconsin
Politicians from Milwaukee
State treasurers of Wisconsin
Wisconsin Republicans